The Men's points race competition at the 2022 UCI Track Cycling World Championships was held on 14 October 2022.

Results
The race was started at 18:32.

References

Men's points race